Boneh-ye Nafal (also Romanized as Boneh Nafal; also known as Nafal) is a village in Jayezan Rural District, Jayezan District, Omidiyeh County, Khuzestan Province, Iran. At the 2006 census, its population was 122, in 22 families.

References 

Populated places in Omidiyeh County